A list of the tallest structures in Luxembourg. The list contains all types of structures.

External links 
 
 

Tallest structures in Luxembourg, List of
Luxembourg